José de Jesús Horacio Pimiento Rodríguez (18 February 1919 – 3 September 2019) was a Colombian prelate of the Catholic Church who served as Bishop of Montería from 1959 to 1964, Bishop of Garzón-Neiva from 1964 to 1975, and finally Archbishop of Manizales from 1975 to 1996. He was created a cardinal by Pope Francis in 2015.

Life and career 
Pimiento Rodríguez was born in Zapatoca to Agustín Pimiento Lizarazo and Salomé Rodríguez Castillo. He was baptized on 4 March 1919. He was ordained a priest on 14 December 1941, fulfilling his dream despite his family's economic hardship. Pimiento served as coadjutor vicar in parishes in Mogotes, as well as in the cathedrals of San Gil and Vélez.

He was appointed an auxiliary bishop of the Diocese of Pasto, as well as titular bishop of Apollonis, by Pope Pius XII on 14 June 1955, and consecrated on 28 August 1955. On 30 December 1959, Pope John XXIII appointed Pimiento bishop of the Diocese of Monteria and later by Pope Paul VI as bishop of the Diocese of Garzón-Neiva on 29 February 1964. He participated in the Second Vatican Council from 1962 to 1965, and served as President of the Episcopal Conference of Colombia from 1972 to 1978.

His final appointment was on 22 May 1975, as Archbishop of Manizales, where he emphasised the implementation of Council decrees, such as in the pastoral care of family and youth, as well as updating the process of priestly formation in the archdiocese, including by restructuring the minor seminary to become the archdiocesan major seminary. Pimiento also oversaw the restoration of the cathedral of Manizales's bell towers, which were damaged in an earthquake in 1979. After the Nevado del Ruiz volcano erupted in 1985, he helped shelter hundreds of people fleeing other cities in the region. He retired on 15 October 1996 and later resumed work as a parish priest.

Cardinal 
On 4 January 2015, Pope Francis announced that he would make him a cardinal on 14 February of the same year, four days short of his 96th birthday. Pimiento was described by those who knew him as "imbued with the spirit of the Second Vatican Council". He did not travel to the consistory due to his advanced age; arrangements were made for him to receive his biretta and ring from fellow Colombian cardinal Rubén Salazar Gómez in Bogotá. He was assigned the titular church of San Giovanni Crisostomo a Monte Sacro Alto.

Death 
Pimiento Rodríguez died from heart failure during the afternoon on 3 September 2019 at a retreat house in Floridablanca, near Bucaramanga. He had recently been hospitalized after a fall and released. At the time of his death he had been the oldest member of the College of Cardinals since the death of Loris Francesco Capovilla in 2016.

References

External links
 

1919 births
2019 deaths
Colombian centenarians
Men centenarians
Participants in the Second Vatican Council
20th-century Roman Catholic bishops in Colombia
People from Zapatoca
Colombian cardinals
Cardinals created by Pope Francis
Major Seminary of Bogotá alumni
Roman Catholic bishops of Montería
Roman Catholic bishops of Garzón
Roman Catholic archbishops of Manizales